The 2013 America East men's basketball tournament began on March 9 and concluded with the championship game on March 16.  The quarterfinals and semifinals were played on March 9 and 10 at SEFCU Arena in Albany, NY, while the 2013 championship game was held on March 16 at the home of the highest remaining seed. The winner earned an automatic bid to the 2013 NCAA tournament.

Although the conference had nine members, only eight participated in that year's tournament. Boston University, which left the America East after the season to join the Patriot League, had been barred from conference postseason play. America East bylaws allowed the conference to prevent a departing member from participating in its postseason tournaments, and the America East chose to enforce this rule against Boston University.

Bracket and Results

Championship game hosted by Vermont.

See also
America East Conference

References

America East Conference men's basketball tournament
2012–13 America East Conference men's basketball season
2013 in sports in Vermont
Basketball competitions in Albany, New York
College basketball tournaments in New York (state)
Sports competitions in Burlington, Vermont
College basketball tournaments in Vermont